Picea engelmannii, with the common names Engelmann spruce, white spruce, mountain spruce, and silver spruce, is a species of spruce native to western North America. It is mostly a high-altitude mountain tree but also appears in watered canyons.

Description 

The crown is narrow conic in young trees, becoming cylindric in older trees. The shoots are buff-brown to orange-brown, usually densely pubescent, and with prominent pulvini. The needles have a pungent odour when crushed.

Purple cones of about 1 cm appear in spring, releasing yellow pollen when windy. The cones are pendulous, slender cylindrical, 2.5–8 cm long and 1.5 cm broad when closed, opening to 3 cm broad. They have thin, flexible scales 15–20 mm long, with a wavy margin. They are reddish to dark purple, maturing to light brown 4–7 months after pollination. The seeds are black, 2–3 mm long, with a slender, 5–8 mm long light brown wing.

The tree grows in a krummholz form along the fringe of alpine tundras.

Distribution

Engelmann spruce is native to western North America, primarily in the Rocky Mountains and east slopes of the Cascade range from central British Columbia to Southern Oregon in the Cascades and commonly in Montana, Idaho, and Colorado, and more sparsely towards Arizona and New Mexico in the Sky islands; there are also two isolated populations in Northern Mexico. It is mostly a high-altitude mountain tree, in many areas reaching the tree line, but at lower elevations occupies cool watered canyons. It can also be found in the Monashee and Selkirk Mountains, as well as the highlands surrounding the Interior Plateau.

Ecology

Both water uptake and water stored in roots appear to be critical for the survival of subalpine Engelmann spruce saplings that are exposed above the snowpack in later winter to early spring. Transpiration is greatly reduced in small saplings while engulfed in snowpack. For exposed trees, the availability of soil water may be critical in late winter, when transpirational demands increase. Increased rates of transpiration in response to loss of snowpack, coupled with low sapwood water reserves and an extended period of soil frost in windswept areas, may prevent Engelmann spruce from regenerating in open areas both above and below the tree line. Cuticular damage by windblown ice is probably more important at the tree line, but damage caused by desiccation is likely to be more important at lower elevations.

Despite wind damage, the species tends to grow taller than others at the tree line. It is shade tolerant, but not so much as subalpine fir. Thus, it is somewhat dependent on fires to outgrow competitors, although its thin bark and shallow roots make it vulnerable to fire as well. Spruce bark beetles attack the tree, being particularly deadly to groups which have stood for centuries. It is also susceptible to avalanches.

Although older spruce forests are not very useful to animals for forage, they are so in the aftermath of fires, which allow many other plants to rise. Engelmann spruce-shaded streams are exploited by trout. Additionally, aphids produce galls which hang from the tree and look similar to cones when they dry out.

Subspecies and hybrids 
Two geographical subspecies (treated as varieties by some authors, and as distinct species by others) occur:
Picea engelmannii subsp. engelmannii (Engelmann spruce). All of the range except as below.
Picea engelmannii subsp. mexicana (Mexican spruce). Two isolated populations on high mountains in northern Mexico, on the Sierra del Carmen in Coahuila (Sierra Madre Oriental) and on Cerro Mohinora in Chihuahua (Sierra Madre Occidental). Engelmann spruces of the Madrean sky islands mountains in the extreme southeast of Arizona and southwest of New Mexico also probably belong to this subspecies, though this is disputed.

The Engelmann spruce hybridises and intergrades extensively with the closely related white spruce (Picea glauca), found further north and east in the Rockies, and to a lesser extent with the closely related Sitka spruce where they meet on the western fringes of the Cascades.

Uses 
Native Americans made various medicines from the resin and foliage.

Engelmann spruce is of economic importance for its wood, being light and fairly strong. It harvested for paper-making and general construction. Wood from slow-grown trees at high altitude has a specialised use in making musical instruments such as acoustic guitars, harps, violins, and pianos. Because it is odourless and has little resin, it has been used for food containers such as barrels. It is also used to a small extent as a Christmas tree.

Gallery

References

Further reading
The Gymnosperm Database
US Forest Service: Fire Effects Information System
Little, Elbert L. (1980), National Audubon Society Field Guide to Trees: Western Region

External links

Jepson Manual Treatment
Arboretum de Villardebelle – Photographs related spruce cones
CalPhotos

engelmannii
Trees of the Western United States
Trees of Western Canada
Trees of the West Coast of the United States
Trees of Northwestern Mexico
Trees of Chihuahua (state)
Trees of Coahuila
Trees of the Northwestern United States
Trees of the Southwestern United States
Trees of the South-Central United States
Flora of the Cascade Range
Flora of the Klamath Mountains
Flora of the Rocky Mountains
Alpine flora
Least concern flora of the United States
Taxa named by George Engelmann
Taxa named by Charles Christopher Parry
Flora of the Sierra Madre Occidental